Mating disruption (MD) is a pest management technique designed to control certain insect pests by introducing artificial stimuli that confuse the individuals and disrupt mate localization and/or courtship, thus preventing mating and blocking the reproductive cycle. It usually involves the use of synthetic sex pheromones, although other approaches, such as interfering with vibrational communication, are also being developed.

History
La confusion sexuelle or mating disruption, was first discussed by the Institut national de la recherche agronomique in 1974 in Bordeaux, France.

Winemakers in France, Switzerland, Spain, Germany, and Italy were the first to use the method to treat vines against the larvae of the moth genus Cochylis.

Mechanism
In many insect species of interest to agriculture, such as those in the order Lepidoptera, females emit an airborne trail of a  specific chemical blend constituting that species' sex pheromone. This aerial trail is referred to as a pheromone plume. 

Males of that species use the information contained in the pheromone plume to locate the emitting female (known as a “calling” female). Mating disruption exploits the male insects' natural response to follow the plume by introducing a synthetic pheromone into the insects’ habitat. The synthetic pheromone is a volatile organic chemical designed to mimic the species-specific sex pheromone produced by the female insect. The general effect of mating disruption is to confuse the male insects by masking the natural pheromone plumes, causing the males to follow “false pheromone trails” at the expense of finding mates, and affecting the males’ ability to respond to “calling" females. Consequently, the male population experiences a reduced probability of successfully locating and mating with females, which leads to the eventual cessation of breeding and collapse of the insect infestation. The California Department of Pesticide Regulation, the California Department of Food and Agriculture, and the United States Environmental Protection Agency consider mating disruption to be among the most environmentally friendly treatments used to eradicate pest infestations. Mating disruption works best if large areas are treated with pheromones. Ten acres is a good minimum size for a successful MD program, but larger areas are preferable[2]

Advantages of mating disruption 
Pheromone programs are most effective when controlling low to moderate pest population densities. MD has also been identified as a pest control method in which the insect does not become resistant[1]. The scientific community, together with governmental agencies throughout the world, understands the benefits of mating disruption using species-specific sex pheromones, and consider sex-pheromone-based insect control programs among the most environmentally friendly treatments to be used to manage and control insect pest populations. Insect pheromone has been successfully used as an effective tool to slow the spread and to eradicate pests from very large areas in the US; for example to control the  Gypsy moth (Lymantria dispar), a devastating forestry pest, and to eradicate the boll weevil and pink bollworm, two of the most damaging pest of cotton. Conventional pesticide based control methods, kill insects directly, whereas mating disruption confuses male insects from accurately locating a mating partner, leading to the eventual collapse of the mating cycle[3]. Mating disruption, due to the specificity of the sex pheromone of the insect species, has the benefit of only affecting the males of that species, while leaving other non target species unaffected[3]. This allows for very targeted pest management, promoting the suppression of a single pest species, leaving the populations of beneficial insects (pollinators and natural enemies) intact. Mating disruption, like most pest management strategies, is a useful technique, but should not be considered a stand-alone treatment program[1] for it targets only a single species in plant production systems that usually have several pests of concern. Mating disruption is a valuable tool that should be used in Integrated Pest Management(IPM) programs. 

Pheromone programs have been used for several decades around the globe and to date (2009) there is no documented public health evidence to suggest that agricultural use of synthetic pheromones is harmful to humans or to any other non-target species. However, continuing research is being conducted.

Disadvantages of mating disruption 
Over the decades that pheromone pest programs have been used several disadvantages have been argued when compared to the use of conventional pesticides. Most pheromones target a single species, so a specific mating disruption formulation controls only the species that uses that pheromone blend; whereas pesticides usually kill indiscriminately a plethora of species, including multiple species with a single application. Some synthetic pheromones have high developmental and production costs, causing the mating disruption technique to be too costly to be adopted by conventional commercial growers. Furthermore most commercial pheromone mating disruption formulations must be applied by hand, which can be an expensive and time consuming. Novel pheromone formulations recently developed to be mechanically applied provide long lasting mating disruption effects (e.g., depending on the target pest a single application of SPLAT  controls the target pest for a complete reproductive cycle, or for the entire season

Methods of dispersal

Microencapsulated pheromones 

Microencapsulated pheromones (MECs) are small droplets of pheromone enclosed within polymer capsules. The capsules control the release rate of the pheromone into the surrounding environment. The capsules are small enough to be applied in the same method as used to spray insecticides. The effective field longevity of the microencapsulated pheromone formulations ranges from a few days to slightly more than a week, depending on climatic conditions, capsule size and chemical properties[1]. Microcapsules in the pheromone formulations are usually kept above a prescribed diameter to avoid the risk of inhalation by humans.

Hand applied dispensers 

Hollow tube dispensers are plastic twist-tie type dispensers, plastic hollow fibers or plastic hollow microfibers fibers, filled with synthetic sex pheromone and placed throughout the area to be protected.
Pheromone Baits and Stations are a stationary, attract and kill type of dispensers. Some are relatively large platform, containing a pheromone lure inside a glue board that ensnares the attracted insect. Other pheromone bait stations contain a pheromone lure in conjunction with a surface containing a dose of insecticide that reduces the attracted insect's fitness, thus reducing its ability to mate and reproduce.
High-emission dispensers There are several very high dose pheromone dispensers, some do it passively, like pheromone sachets and large dollops of SPLAT pheromone formulations, others do it be actively releasing bursts of sex pheromone at timed intervals.

Monolithic Flowable dispensers 

A new, effective and economical concept in pheromone delivery using a flowable formulation to create long lasting monolithic pheromone dispensers has been brought to the market in the past decade. These novel SPLAT pheromone mating disruption formulations can provide effective season long suppression effect (e.g., depending on the target pest a single application of SPLAT controls the target pest for a complete reproductive cycle, or for the entire season) and can be manually or mechanically applied. Although mechanical dispersal techniques require specialized off-the-shelf application technology and/or equipment, once the application system is made to work it allows protection of extensive areas using pheromones, one of the most benign and effective pest management techniques available today. A benefit of SPLAT is that the dollop anchors where it lands, avoiding unwanted drift of the formulation once applied in the field, and, depending on the mode of application, the cured dollops are retrievable.

Aerial dispersal 

In November 2007, a controversial aerial approach was used to spray microencapsulated LBAM pheromone in urban and rural areas of the counties of Santa Cruz and Monterey California to combat the invasive light brown apple moth. Usually the effect of disruption of orientation of the male moths to females (or monitoring pheromone traps) can be detected by the reduction in moth capture in monitoring pheromone traps.  The government campaign using areawide aerial microencapsulated pheromone applications failed to show any sign of mating disruption on the light brown apple moth populations in the treated area. It was found that the first aerial campaign was performed using an incomplete (the wrong) pheromone blend of the light brown apple moth (the wrong blend decreased tremendously the likelihood of success of the mating disruption program), and the LBAM microencapsulated formulation was untested, and finally, microencapsule formulations are notoriously known for their short field life, weak and erratic performance. Furthermore it is possible that the LBAM microencapsulated formulation used in the government campaign was unfit for aerial delivery in urban areas; although pheromone is safe, the formulation used had microcapsules of very small diameter which made it into a possible inhalation hazard that seems to be linked to an increase in allergenic reactions of the population in the target area. This set of LBAM mating disruption aerial applications done by the government has created tremendous dissent of the public in general as well as of several sectors of the scientific community. Now, several years later, the affected communities as well as the nascent US pheromone industry (which provides safer, yet very effective, alternatives to the use of conventional pesticides) are still suffering the ripple effects of these disastrous Bay Area LBAM eradication campaigns.

But there are numerous, successful pest suppression programs that rely on aerial dispersal of pheromone mating disruptants. One of the largest pheromone mating disruption programs in the globe is the Gypsy Moth Slow the Spread. Gypsy Moth Slow the Spread has been implemented across the  gypsy moth frontier from Wisconsin to North Carolina. The program area is located ahead of the advancing front of the gypsy moth population. The STS program focuses on early detection and suppression of the low–level populations along this advancing front, disrupting the natural progress of population buildup and spread. Every year hundreds of thousands of acres are aerially sprayed with two pheromone Gypsy moth pheromone mating disruption formulations, Flakes and SPLAT. A single mating disruption formulation application promotes season-long suppression of gypsy moth in the treated areas. The consortium of Federal and State participants have been able to do the following: 

• protect forests, forest–based industries, urban and rural parks, and private property; and 

• avoid at least $22 million per year in damage and management costs.

It seems that the tremendous success of the Gypsy Moth Slow the Spread program is related to extremely well planned campaigns, which involves communication, transparency and clarity of objectives: in advance to an application STS holds meetings  that include the area population in general, concerned citizens, public officials, scientists and technical personnel to discuss strategies of management of Gypsy moth in the areas of concern. There is a movement requesting that new government invasive species eradication campaigns model their pest suppression actions on the existing successful suppression programs like GM STS, and embrace a more effective policy of communication, transparency and clarity of objectives. With the involvement and education of the public, areawide eradication campaigns will be better planned and more able to deliver decisive end effective pest eradication actions.

See also
Integrated pest management
Pest (organism)
Pesticide
Pheromones
Codling moth

References 

Agronomy
Pest control techniques
Biological pest control
Chemical ecology